Chronopoulos is a surname. Notable people with the surname include:

Denny Chronopoulos (1968–2000), Canadian football player
Ted Chronopoulos (born 1972), American soccer player